The Armstrong limit or Armstrong's line is a measure of altitude above which atmospheric pressure is sufficiently low that water boils at the normal temperature of the human body. Exposure to pressure below this limit results in a rapid loss of consciousness, followed by a series of changes to cardiovascular and neurological functions, and eventually death, unless pressure is restored within 60–90 seconds.

The term is named after United States Air Force General Harry George Armstrong, who was the first to recognize this phenomenon.

Effect on body fluids 

At or above the Armstrong limit, exposed body fluids such as saliva, tears, urine, and the liquids wetting the alveoli within the lungs—but not vascular blood (blood within the circulatory system)—will boil away without a full-body pressure suit, and no amount of breathable oxygen delivered by any means will sustain life for more than a few minutes. The NASA technical report Rapid (Explosive) Decompression Emergencies in Pressure-Suited Subjects, which discusses the brief accidental exposure of a human to near vacuum, notes: "The subject later reported that ... his last conscious memory was of the saliva on his tongue beginning to boil."

Hypoxia below the Armstrong limit 
Well below the Armstrong limit, humans typically require supplemental oxygen in order to avoid hypoxia. For most people, this is typically needed at altitudes above 4,500 m (15,000 ft). U.S. regulations on general aviation aircraft (non-airline, non-government flights) require that the minimum required flight crew, but not the passengers, be on supplemental oxygen if the plane spends more than half an hour at a cabin altitude above . Skydivers, who are at altitude only briefly before jumping, do not normally exceed .

Historical significance 

The Armstrong limit describes the altitude associated with an objective, precisely defined natural phenomenon: the vapor pressure of body-temperature water. In the late 1940s, it represented a new fundamental, hard limit to altitude that went beyond the somewhat subjective observations of human physiology and the timedependent effects of hypoxia experienced at lower altitudes. Pressure suits had long been worn at altitudes well below the Armstrong limit to avoid hypoxia. In 1936, Francis Swain of the Royal Air Force reached  flying a Bristol Type 138 while wearing a pressure suit.

Air contains 20.95% oxygen. At higher altitudes, oxygen must be delivered through a sealed mask with increased pressure, to maintain a physiologically adequate partial pressure of oxygen. If the user does not wear a pressure suit or a counter-pressure garment that restricts the movement of their chest, the high pressure air can cause damage to the lungs.

In the event the cockpit loses pressure, the oxygen system switches to a positive-pressure mode to deliver above-ambient-pressure oxygen to a specially sealing mask as well as to proportionally inflate the counter-pressure garment. The garment counters the outward expansion of the pilot's chest to prevent pulmonary barotrauma until the pilot can descend to a safe altitude.

See also

References

External links 
 
 
 

Atmosphere
Aviation medicine
Altitudes in aviation
Human spaceflight
Human physiology